The Bushman-Relics Protection Act, 1911 was a South African Act to protect drawings, paintings, petrographs created by San people or other aboriginals obtained from graves, caves, rock-shelters and shell-mounds from being removed from the Republic without a permit being issued.

Content of the Act
The following is a brief description of the sections of the Bushman-Relics Protection Act, 1911:

Definitions and interpretation
Section 1
Defines the explanations of keywords in the Act as to what a Bushman-relic is and who is the Minister responsible. 
Section 2
Defines that a Bushman-relic cannot be removed from the Republic without a written permit from the Minister, and what documents are needed to accompany the application for a permit.
Section 3
Defines the penalties if found guilty of an offence as a fine of a maximum of £50 or imprisonment of up to 3 months on failure to pay the fine.
Section 4
Defines the Governor-general's ability to make regulations to carry out the object of Act.
Section 5
Defines the name of the Act.

Reference

1911 in South African law